Eugenia Birioukova (born 18 December 1952) is a former Soviet professional tennis player from Azerbaijan.

A right-handed player from Baku, Birioukova won the singles title at the 1972 U.S.S.R. tennis championships and finished the season as the top ranked player in the Soviet rankings, ahead of Olga Morozova.

Birioukova competed in the main draw of all four grand slam tournaments during her career. She was a doubles semi-finalist at the 1973 French Open, partnering Mona Schallau. On the WTA Tour, she made the singles final of a tournament in Charlotte, which she lost to Evonne Goolagong.

WTA Finals

Singles (0-1)

References

External links
 
 

1952 births
Living people
Soviet female tennis players
Azerbaijani female tennis players
Sportspeople from Baku
Universiade medalists in tennis
Universiade silver medalists for the Soviet Union
Universiade bronze medalists for the Soviet Union
Medalists at the 1977 Summer Universiade
Medalists at the 1979 Summer Universiade